Sannidal is a former municipality which is now located in the municipality of Kragerø in Telemark county, Norway.

History
Sannidal is situated at the end of the Kil fjord. For this reason it was one of the earliest settlements in the area, being an important link between the sea and the land. The village of Kil was important for both exports and imports since the boat was the main means of transport at the time. Exports of timber dating from 1600s-1700s gave the area a good income and made Kil the first commercial center for Sannidal and surrounding country.

The parish of Sandøkedal, as it was formerly known was established as a municipality January 1, 1838 (see formannskapsdistrikt). Skåtøy was separated from Sannidal January 1, 1882. (After the separation Sannidal had 2,186 inhabitants.) Sannidal (together with Skåtøy) was merged with Kragerø January 1, 1960. Sannidal at the time had 2,604 inhabitants.

Etymology
Until 1857 the name was written "Sannikedal", in the period 1857–88 "Sandøkedal", in the period 1889–1917 (again) "Sannikedal", from 1918 onwards "Sannidal". The Old Norse form of the name was Sandaukadalr. The first element is the genitive case of a word sandauki m 'increase of sand', the last element is dalr m 'dale, valley'. The first element is probably referring to some sandbanks.

Sannidal Church 
Sannidal Church is a log-built church shaped in the form of a cross, dating back to 1771. It lies next to the old main road going south from Oslo to Kristiansand. Outside the church there is a big churchyard with two tall monuments to commemorate the men lost at war. The one to the south of the church is a reminder of the Napoleonic Wars 1807–1814 when Norway was under Denmark and fighting on Napoleon's side against the British fleet. The monument outside the church entrance was erected after the last war. Every 8 May on Norwegian Armistice Day and on 17 May, Constitution Day, wreaths are laid in honour of the men who gave their lives for King and country.  

The present church came into use during the autumn of 1772. At that time Sannidal was under Krageroe. Sannidal did not have its own vicar neither did it have its own parish clerk. The building of the church can be credited to Jacob Matssøn Lund, appointed vicar of Kragerø and Sannidal in 1766; he was an able man who in addition to studying theology also had learned medicine and anatomy. He was the first to vaccinate against smallpox and also instrumental in organising the general education in the village in 1777.

The stave church 
Prior to the present church there was a stave church dating back to 1200, which was located on the small hill to the south of the present church. The reason for building the new one was that the stave church was dilapidated, a cold and drafty place during the winter period.
The stave church was dedicated to St. Laurentius, the Roman deacon burnt on the fire during the persecution of Christians in 258 under the emperor Valerian. 

Remains of the old stave church can be seen in the present church and old planks are used in the floor and roof. Some remains are also stored at Norsk Folkemuseum in Oslo where the pulpit and altarpiece are displayed. Stave churches date back a long time in Norway, they came with the introduction of Christianity to Norway and a total of more than 750 were once in use, today 31 remain.

The location for the church is also historical in that in pre-Christian times, before the years 1000–1100 in Norway, the place was used as a site for worshipping the old Norse gods. There was most probably a gudehov (pagan temple) located here.

The first time the church is mentioned is in Bishop Eystein's "red book" from 1398. Here it is referred to as "Moo kirkia j Sandhauka dale". Eystein Aslaksson was bishop in Oslo from 1385, and he was given the job of getting the poor economy of his bishopric in shape.  During his yearly visitation he collected material describing the church's earthly goods. The name red book stems from the red cover it was given during the 16th century.

The stave church was located in the grounds of Moo farm, hence the name. Today the area is referred to as Mo, with the original farm halfway up the hill to the north of the church. Farms with single-syllable names are usually the oldest in the area, and in this case refer to being a farm located on a sand- and gravel-rich moraine.

Church vestibule 
The Church vestibule was restored for the 200-year-Jubilee in 1972 by recommendation of the Chief Inspector of Historic Buildings. It houses a grave plate cast at Mørland foundry in Kjølebrønd, in olden times a very busy place, south along the Kil fjord. The foundry was operational 1641–65 and the grave plate is from 1643 with the name Anna Krefting on it, probably the wife of Herman Krefting, who operated the foundry in its first years.

The old entrance door displayed on the south wall is from the old stave church as are the wooden entrance pillars on both sides of the door to the church nave. A small sword used to protect oneself on the way to church is also displayed on the south wall. Wild animals and robbers were a common occurrence in Norway, in fact so common that the Norwegian name for the vestibule is våpenhuset, the place to store weapons. Weapons are not to be worn in the room where Christ the Saviour is worshipped. A visitor to a Sunday service at the church might notice some people wear a sheathed knife in their belt: in Sannidal this is not a weapon, but is a most important tool for the Sannidøl, the home of many famous knife smiths and makers. A portrait gallery of vicars is also to be seen on the south wall. The longest reigning vicar, Torkell A. Tande, was also a member of parliament for many years.

Nave 
The pulpit was donated by Knut Knutsen Dobbe and made in the early 19th century in a late Louis XVI style modelled along antique ideas. It is carved by Peder Olsen, a foundry model maker engaged by Bolvig, Froland and Egelands foundry. The old soapstone christening font dates back to 1200. Next to the pulpit and the reader's chair there are two Gothic style two-armed candlestick holders going back to the 15th century. The importance of timber and later ice export on sailing ships for the area can be seen in the warrior sailing ship with cannons ready to fight for Christ.

Altar 
The altar silver and Eucharist vessels also date back to the stave church and were given as gifts in the beginning of the 18th century.  The storage case for the Eucharist bread was a gift from the skipper and the owner of the skip Patriarchen Jacob in thanks to God for intervening and saving the ship off the coast of Holland in 1703. A wine mug in silver was given in 1708 by skipper Olle Nielsøn and both his sons Niels and Jon Olesøn together with seven others. The intention was "to honour God and for beautifying of the altar in Sannidal church", according to the Norwegian engraved on it. The altar piece showing the crucifixion of Christ comes from the old "Christi kirke" in Kragerø dismantled in 1870. The piece is from the 17th century.

On the altar lies a Frederik 2nd edition bible, printed in Copenhagen in 1589. Nils Jensen Farsjø donated it.
The eye on the top of the altar piece is decorated with painted cherubs and radiating light; it probably also comes from the old "Christi kirke".

Community 
Near to the church is the "Kirkestua", an old school building today used by the vicar and church clerk as well as a meeting place for small groups. It is also used for confirmation classes. Traditionally the large majority of Norwegian youth get confirmed while in their 9th school year. Confirmation is one of the main family gatherings and is a big feast day on the church calendar at the beginning of May. 
The white house on the northern side of the road is the mission chapel run by Mo Evangelic Lutheran home mission. It is used for Christian meetings as well as a place for family gatherings after important church functions such as confirmations, weddings, christenings and burials.
Bygdetunet is located approximately 500 m to the west. This is a living museum exhibiting old houses from the area. This site is also used for important village gatherings such as 17 May celebration.

References

Former municipalities of Norway
Kragerø